The 2000–01 NBA season was the 54th season of the National Basketball Association in New York City, New York. During the off-season, the Knicks acquired All-Star forward Glen Rice from the Los Angeles Lakers, acquired Erick Strickland from the Dallas Mavericks, and acquired Luc Longley from the Phoenix Suns; Longley won three championships with the Chicago Bulls during their second three-peat in the 1990s. In their first season without Patrick Ewing, the Knicks remained a perennial playoff contender, holding a 29–18 record at the All-Star break. At midseason, the team traded Chris Childs to the Toronto Raptors in exchange for former Knicks guard Mark Jackson and Muggsy Bogues, who never played for the Knicks due to a knee injury, while Strickland was dealt to the Vancouver Grizzlies in exchange for Othella Harrington. The Knicks finished third in the Atlantic Division with a 48–34 record, earning the #4 seed in the Eastern Conference, and made the playoffs for the fourteenth consecutive year.

Allan Houston led the team in scoring with 18.7 points per game, while Latrell Sprewell averaged 17.7 points and 1.4 steals per game. Houston and Sprewell were both selected for the 2001 NBA All-Star Game. In addition, Rice and Marcus Camby both contributed 12.0 points per game each, while Camby led the team with 11.5 rebounds and 2.2 blocks per game, Kurt Thomas provided with 10.4 points and 6.7 rebounds per game, and Larry Johnson contributed 9.9 points and 5.6 rebounds per game.

In the playoffs, the Knicks took a 2–1 series lead over the 5th-seeded Raptors in the Eastern Conference First Round. However, the Knicks failed to advance to the second round for the first time in ten years, as they were beaten by the Raptors in five games after a 93–89 Game 5 home loss in New York. Following the season, Rice was traded to the Houston Rockets after just one season in New York. Also following the season, due to lingering injuries, Johnson, Longley and Bogues all retired.

The Knicks would not return to the playoffs until 2004.

Offseason
After 15 years with the New York Knicks, due to chronological age and injuries, Patrick Ewing parted ways with the organization on September 20, 2000 in a 4-team trade which involves the Seattle SuperSonics, the Phoenix Suns, and the Los Angeles Lakers. In the deal, the Knicks acquire Travis Knight, Glen Rice, and a 2001 1st round draft pick (#27, traded to Vancouver) from the Lakers, Luc Longley from the Phoenix Suns, Lazaro Borrell, Vernon Maxwell, Vladimir Stepania, two 2001 2nd round picks (#s 39 and 43; neither player selected ever played in the NBA), and a 2002 1st round pick (#20, traded to Toronto) from Seattle. During regular season, the Knicks later traded Erick Strickland, a 2001 1st and 2nd round draft picks to the Vancouver Grizzlies for Othella Harrington. And then Chris Childs and a 2002 1st round pick to the Toronto Raptors for Muggsy Bogues and Mark Jackson.

NBA Draft

Roster

Roster Notes
 Point guard Muggsy Bogues was acquired from the Toronto Raptors at midseason, but did not play for the Knicks due to a chronic knee injury.

Regular season

Standings

z - clinched division title
y - clinched division title
x - clinched playoff spot

Record vs. opponents

Schedule

Playoffs

|- align="center" bgcolor="#ccffcc"
| 1
| April 22
| Toronto
| W 92–85
| Allan Houston (23)
| Marcus Camby (18)
| Mark Jackson (6)
| Madison Square Garden19,763
| 1–0
|- align="center" bgcolor="#ffcccc"
| 2
| April 26
| Toronto
| L 74–94
| Kurt Thomas (23)
| Kurt Thomas (12)
| Mark Jackson (5)
| Madison Square Garden19,763
| 1–1
|- align="center" bgcolor="#ccffcc"
| 3
| April 29
| @ Toronto
| W 97–89
| Allan Houston (24)
| Kurt Thomas (9)
| Latrell Sprewell (5)
| Air Canada Centre20,217
| 2–1
|- align="center" bgcolor="#ffcccc"
| 4
| May 2
| @ Toronto
| L 93–100
| Allan Houston (27)
| Kurt Thomas (10)
| Kurt Thomas (5)
| Air Canada Centre20,282
| 2–2
|- align="center" bgcolor="#ffcccc"
| 5
| May 4
| Toronto
| L 89–93
| Latrell Sprewell (29)
| Kurt Thomas (12)
| Mark Jackson (7)
| Madison Square Garden19,763
| 2–3
|-

Player stats

NOTE: Please write players statistics in alphabetical order by last name.

Season

Playoffs

Awards and records

Records

Milestones

See also
2000–01 NBA season

References

 Knicks on Database Basketball
 Knicks on Basketball Reference

New York Knicks seasons
New York Knicks
New York Knicks
New York Knick
2000s in Manhattan
Madison Square Garden